The Last Wagon is a 1956 American CinemaScope Western film starring Richard Widmark. It was co-written and directed by Delmer Daves and tells a story set during the American Indian Wars: the survivors of an Indian massacre must rely on a man wanted for several murders to lead them out of danger.

Plot
Sheriff Bull Harper (George Mathews) has captured and is taking "Comanche" Todd (Richard Widmark), a white man who has lived most of his life among Comanche Indians, to be tried for the murder of Harper's three brothers.

The pair join a wagon train led by Colonel Normand (Douglas Kennedy). Jenny's young brother Billy is intrigued by Todd, who appreciates the boy's good-hearted attention.

Harper's brutal treatment of Todd causes friction with some members of the wagon train. When the sheriff beats a lad for giving Todd a pipe to smoke, Todd takes advantage of the distraction to kill his tormentor with a dropped axe.

That night, while six of the young people sneak away for a late night swim, Apaches kill everyone else, except Todd, who miraculously survives when the wagon to which he is handcuffed is pushed off a cliff. The Apaches are gathering to avenge the massacre of their own women and children by whites. It is up to Todd to lead the survivors to safety, despite the distrust of some of them. Along the way, he and Jenny (Felicia Farr) fall in love. Jenny tells him about the marriage proposal she accepted, because her and Billy's parents are dead. Todd reveals to Jenny how he was raised by Indians. His father had been a traveling preacher who Todd traveled with. When he was eight, his father died far from any town. Todd stayed by his father's body for three days and was close to death when the Comanches stumbled upon them. They saved Todd and he was adopted and raised as one of their own. The group manages to travel safely for five days, avoiding a large nearby Apache war party.

Todd then notices that a small U.S. cavalry detachment has appeared, and the Indians have broken camp, concealing themselves. Todd saves all from an ambush, but he is recognized by the army and brought to trial. He reveals that the Harpers murdered his Indian wife and two young sons after they attacked his farm. After hearing from Jenny and others about how Todd saved them all, General Howard takes pity on him and places him in the permanent "custody" of Jenny and Billy.

Cast
 Richard Widmark as Comanche Todd 
 Felicia Farr as Jenny 
 Susan Kohner as Jolie Normand 
 Tommy Rettig as Billy
 Stephanie Griffin as Valinda Normand
 Ray Stricklyn as Clint
 Nick Adams as Ridge
 Carl Benton Reid as Gen. Howard 
 Douglas Kennedy as Col. Normand 
 George Mathews as Sheriff Bull Harper 
 James Drury as Lt. Kelly
 Ken Clark as Sergeant

Production
The film was shot in DeLuxe Color and CinemaScope on location in Sedona, AZ, at the mouth of Oak Creek Canyon, and mostly along Schnebly Hill Road. Director Delmer Daves described the difficulty of finding a pristine location for the film, as his previous western, Broken Arrow (1950), had popularized the region.

The film has some jarring continuity errors. During the last third of the film, Tommy Rettig's hair goes from being long and fair with a fringe, to being short back and sides and dark and brushed back, and then back again on two occasions, once in the same scene. Rettig had formerly played Richard Widmark's son in both the 1950 film noir Panic in the Streets and the 1955 film The Cobweb.

Reception

Critical response
Bosley Crowther of The New York Times dismissed it as "A familiar and unexciting journey across a plateau of western clichés", but commended George Mathews' portrayal of the sheriff, "The only character in the picture worth attention".

See also
List of American films of 1956

References

External links
 
 
 
 

1956 Western (genre) films
1956 films
20th Century Fox films
American Western (genre) films
Films directed by Delmer Daves
Films scored by Lionel Newman
CinemaScope films
1950s English-language films
1950s American films